Angelo Nicholas Goucar Congear (5 May 1885 – 9 August 1986) was an Australian rules footballer who played for the Port Adelaide Football Club in the South Australian National Football League between 1908 and 1922.

Junior football (1902–1908) 
Congear started playing football in 1902 with the Australs Football Club. In 1908 he started playing for Semaphore Centrals, an affiliate of the Port Adelaide Football Club who he would debut for later that year.

Port Adelaide (1908–1922) 
Angelo Congear debuted in Port Adelaide's fifth match of the 1908 SAFL season against Norwood at Adelaide Oval. In front of a then record crowd of 25,000 at Adelaide Oval, Congear would kick a goal on debut but Port Adelaide would end up losing the match by 13 points.

During his career at Port Adelaide he played in seven Grand finals and won three Championships of Australia. Upon his induction into the Port Adelaide Football Club Hall of Fame he was listed as having played over 150 games.

A reporter for the Daily Herald of Adelaide considered him to be the best player during 's 1914 Championship of Australia victory over Fitzroy.

Reputation 
Angelo Congear was considered to be one of the finest rovers in South Australia in his era.

Personal life 
The Australian-born son of a Greek immigrant father from Kea, Cyclades Islands, Greece, John Angelo Congear, who migrated to Australia in 1861 and lived to be 101 years old. For work Congear would do manual labour on the Port Adelaide wharves, including on the mornings of days he played football.

References

1885 births
1986 deaths
Australian centenarians
Australian rules footballers from South Australia
Port Adelaide Football Club (SANFL) players
Port Adelaide Football Club players (all competitions)
South Australian Football Hall of Fame inductees
Australian people of Greek descent
Men centenarians